Cambridge-Isanti High School is a four-year public high school located in Cambridge, Minnesota, United States.

Athletics
Cambridge-Isanti competes in the Mississippi 8 Conference, consisting of 8 other central Minnesota schools. Prior to the formation of the Mississippi 8 Conference Cambridge-Isanti competed in the North Suburban Conference

References

External links
 

Public high schools in Minnesota
Schools in Isanti County, Minnesota
Educational institutions established in 1850
Cambridge, Minnesota